Keers is a surname. Notable people with the surname include:

Jim Keers (born 1931), English footballer
John Keers (1901–1963), English footballer
Robert Young Keers (1908–1982), Irish-born physician and medical author

See also
Kers

English-language surnames